Forts is a 2D real-time strategy video game developed and published by Australian studio EarthWork Games. It was released on April 19, 2017. Forts started development in March, 2003, as a game originally based on early bridge building games. Forts had sold over a million copies as of March 9, 2022. In Forts, the player builds a base, defends it, and acquires weapons through tech trees in an attempt to destroy the opponent's reactor.

The game has been reviewed by CG Magazine and Kotaku, the former of which described Fortss gameplay as being similar to the Worms series.

Gameplay 
The core gameplay of Forts is similar to many real-time strategy games: build up resources, acquire new technologies, and build something to attack the opponent while defending yourself from their attacks. There are 4 different gamemodes that players can select: Campaign, Skirmish, Multiplayer, and Sandbox. The Campaign includes the tutorial, and 28 training missions which follows three super-powers as they battle it out over the last of the planet's resources, a secondary story-line if the player has bought the Moonshine DLC, and a tertiary story-line if the player has bought the High Seas DLC. Skirmishes allow players to combat AIs at 3 different levels of difficulty. Multiplayer allows the player to join other player's lobbies, compete in ranked matches, and practice in community-made training missions. Sandbox allows the player to experiment in any map without AIs or other players. There are various weapons like missiles, lasers, cannons, minguns, and mortars to attack with, with things like metal reinforcement, sand bags, machine guns, and flak to shoot down projectiles and defend yourself. The goal of the game is to destroy the opponent's core, which can be done through direct damage, like hitting it with a laser or cannon, indirect damage, like setting fire to it or hitting it with splash damage, or through making it fall to the ground by destroying the supporting structures around it. This may sometimes require an objective to be completed, such as capturing points. Forts Multiplayer can hold up to 8 players per lobby in which each player is split on to two teams. The match can be set to team death match where each player gets their own fort and resources, or team co-op where the team shares all resources and bases. There are around 70 maps that come with the game, but there are hundreds of community made maps which can be downloaded and played. Teams are able to choose one of 15 commanders from 5 different factions each with their own unique active and passive abilities, in order to augment their playstyle.

Tournaments 
On May 27, 2017, Earthwork Games started hosting their own official Forts tournaments. Community driven tournaments have been organized, of which many had the developers help out and grant an in-game badge reward to the winner.

The official tournaments are varying team sizes, and have prizes for the top three players as well as a name mention in the winners announcement. The official tournaments are viewable live or as replay from various content creators, including but not limited to Project Incursus, Boberet0 and salzwerk (German)

The latest official tournament was tournament XXII. The qualifiers were on 19 February 2022 and the tournament itself was on 26 February 2022. This was a 2 verus 2 tournament. The winner was team "Sussles", consisting of players AlexD and Firework.

Community driven tournaments are made by various players in the community and are often different from their official counterpart. One example of such is Cronkinator's AI tournament, in which participants must use the game's AI functionality to create an AI that will battle the AI of others.

Not all tournaments are battles. The official tournaments also include Forts Map Making Contest, of which 3 have been organized this far. The winner of the latest is Pyro. In these tournaments players are tasked with creating a custom map for the game. A winner is chosen by a team of judges, often consisting of (members of) the development team and content creators.

Post-release content 

A remastered soundtrack DLC was launched on 20 April 2017, costing 9.99 USD. This includes the official soundtrack from the base game.

The Moonshot DLC was released on 18 June 2019, which costs 7.99 USD, it included four new weapons (Howitzers, Smoke Bombs, Magnabeam, and the Buzzsaw.), three new commanders, portals, a new gamemode, a new HUD for teams, a unique medal that can be seen in lobby by others, and a new soundtrack.

Following the Moonshot DLC, a separate DLC for the soundtrack was released on the same date costing 4.99 USD and allows downloading of the full Moonshot soundtrack.

The Pro HUD DLC was released on 24 June 2020, which costs 2.99 USD. The Pro HUD DLC includes a new color palette in game for the weapons, materials, tech, and devices tabs, new sounds when interacting with the in-game menus, and a unique medal that can be seen in lobby by other players.

The High Seas DLC was released on 25 March 2022, which costs 9.99 USD. The main addition of the DLC is the addition of naval forts with buoyancy physics, along with six new weapons (The dome, Orbital Lasers, Planes, Decoys, Naval Missile Launchers, and Deckguns), a new ammo mechanic, a new campaign, 23 new tracks by Ella van Dyck, several new maps with 17 new dynamic backgrounds, a new HUD and a High Seas badge for all owners, 5 new mission types, and a revised learning curve for new players.

Reception 

Forts received "mixed or average" reviews, according to review aggregator Metacritic.

GameGrin rated the game 7 out of 10 and criticized the game for being too easy while concluding, "Forts is a simple, fun game, has a nice sense of humour and is guaranteed to get your brain whirling as you figure out the best way to build your base, defend your weapons while also pelting the enemy with bullets and bombs."[sic]

Notes

2017 video games
Real-time strategy video games
Video games developed in Australia
Video games scored by Jeff van Dyck
Windows games
Windows-only games
Lua (programming language)-scripted video games
Multiplayer and single-player video games